Husayn ibn Ali is the name of:

Husayn ibn Ali, (625–680), the grandson of the Islamic prophet Muhammad, and the son of Ali, who can be regarded as the most famous one with this name.
 al-Husayn ibn Ali al-Abid (d. 786), leader of an anti-Abbasid rebellion, killed at the Battle of Fakhkh
Hussein bin Ali, Sharif of Mecca (1853/1854–1931), was Sharif and Emir of Mecca from 1908 and King of the Hejaz from 1916 to 1924
Al-Husayn I ibn Ali (1669–1740), the founder of the Husainid Dynasty, which ruled Tunisia until 1957.

See also